The vice chief of the National Guard Bureau (VCNGB) is the second highest-ranking officer of the National Guard Bureau, which is a joint activity of the United States Department of Defense. The vice chief is also the second in charge of the National Guard; which is a joint reserve component of the United States Army and the United States Air Force. The vice chief serves as the principal advisor to the chief of the National Guard Bureau and the secretary of defense, through the chairman of the Joint Chiefs of Staff, on matters involving non-federalized National Guard forces and on other matters as determined by the United States Secretary of Defense. The vice chief also serves as the principal adviser to the secretary of the Army, the secretary of the Air Force, the chief of staff of the Army, and the chief of staff of the Air Force, on matters relating to federalized forces of the United States National Guard and its sub-components; the Army National Guard, and the Air National Guard.

The vice chief position is a statutory office and is nominated for appointment by the President from any eligible National Guard officer holding the rank of major general or above, who has also served at least 10 years of federally recognized active duty in the National Guard. The nominee must have been recommended by their state governor and their service secretary, and must also meet the additional requirements for the position, as determined by the defense secretary and the chairman of the Joint Chiefs of Staff. The nominee must be confirmed via majority vote from the Senate. The vice chief serves a four-year term of office at the pleasure of the president. By statute, the vice chief is appointed as a lieutenant general in the Army or Air Force, serving as a reserve officer on active duty.

The position of vice chief was established via the 1995 National Defense Authorization Act as a two-star office. The 2005 National Defense Authorization Act renamed the position to director of the Joint Staff of the National Guard Bureau. The 2012 National Defense Authorization Act renamed the position back to vice chief of the National Guard Bureau, and elevated the office to a three-star general.

List of Vice Chiefs

See also
Chief of the National Guard Bureau
Senior Enlisted Advisor for the National Guard Bureau

References

External links
 nationalguard.mil - Vice Chief, National Guard Bureau

Joint Chiefs of Staff
National Guard Bureau